Neocouma is a genus of plant in the family Apocynaceae first described as a genus in 1898. It is native to northern South America.

Species
 Neocouma parviflora (Markgr.) Zarucchi - S Venezuela, N Brazil
 Neocouma ternstroemiacea (Müll.Arg.) Pierre - Venezuela, N Brazil, Colombia, Peru

formerly included
Neocouma duckei Markgr. = Mucoa duckei (Markgr.) Zarucchi

References

Apocynaceae genera
Rauvolfioideae